SM91 is the Norwegian designation for a tram type which operated on the Oslo Tramway until 2002. The trams were imported from Sweden, where they had originally run on the Gothenburg Tramway under the designation M25. The trams were originally delivered to the Gothenburg Tramway between 1958 and 1961. A total of 36 trams were eventually exported to Oslo, Norway, numbered 264 to 299.

History
125 trams were built by Hägglund for Göteborgs Spårvägar, where they were designated M25 and given the serial numbers 501–625. They were built between 1958 and 1962. Following the decision to change from left to right-side driving on Dagen H on 3 September 1967, the tram company ordered an additional 130 trams in the M28 and M29 series. The M25s were then sent back to Hägglunds to be converted to right-hand driving, with doors on both sides. Two trams were then driven back-to-back, and the direction of the trams could simply be reversed on Dagen H.

Oslo
In the early 1990s, the Ring 3 bypass highway was being upgraded, and this caused a disruption to the Grünerløkka–Torshov Line at Storo where it crosses this highway. To continue operations on the line, trams had to turn without a turning loop, but the company did not have enough trams which could run this way. However, Gothenburg had a number of surplus M25 trams capable of running back to back trams. The trams were therefore purchased by Oslo at the token price of NOK 1 each, although upgrading the trams for Oslo use cost NOK 200,000. The rear travelling car in a back-to-back set had to be closed during a trip as its doors were facing the wrong side of the road.

The trams were phased out as they were replaced with the new Italian articulated trams (SL95).

2001 accident
Safety concerns regarding the SM91 were raised after a fatal accident during the evening rush hour at Holbergs plass on 16 January 2001. A mother with a stroller caught her foot by the tram doors as she was entering, and was dragged behind the tram when it started to move. The injuries she sustained were fatal.

It was later found that the tram driver had reported trouble with the tram's doors several times in the hours before the accident. Four minutes before the accident, she had requested a new tram, but was denied one because there were no more trams available. Prior to the fatality, there had been several incidents with passengers getting caught in the doors as they were carrying strollers, although in the previous incidents the tram had been able to stop before the situation became more serious.

In the aftermath of the accident, Oslo Sporveier stopped coupling the trams together in two-car trains and ran them only individually. The safeguards against people getting trapped in the doors were also replaced, and emergency handles were installed. Both the tram company and the female 30-year-old tram driver were charged with negligent homicide. In the Oslo District Court, both the company and the driver were acquitted on the homicide charge, but found guilty on lesser counts. On appeal, the tram company was finally convicted in Borgarting Court of Appeal and ordered to pay a fine of NOK 5 million; this was the first time a company had been found guilty of homicide in Norway. The conviction against tram driver on the lesser counts regarding failure to demonstrate due care in the traffic were upheld, and she received a 30-day suspended jail sentence.

Specifications
The M25 Class was built by Hägglunds as 125 single-car trams from 1958 to 1962. They are equipped with two bogies, each with two axles, giving a Bo'Bo' wheel arrangement.

The trams seated 38 people and stood 38 more.

References

Oslo Tramway stock
600 V DC multiple units
Multiple units of Norway